Schlieren railway station is a railway station in Switzerland, situated in the municipality of Schlieren. The station is located on the Zurich to Olten main line and is a stop of the Zurich S-Bahn served by lines S11 and S12.

The former Schlieren carriage works of the Schweizerische Wagons- und Aufzügefabrik AG Schlieren-Zürich were once situated adjacent to the station. The works closed in 1985, and the site is now partially occupied by a printing works for the Neue Zürcher Zeitung.

References

External links 

Schlieren railway station on SBB-CFF-FFS web site

Railway stations in the canton of Zürich
Swiss Federal Railways stations
Schlieren, Switzerland
Railway stations in Switzerland opened in 1847